"Trampled Under Foot" is a song by English rock group Led Zeppelin. A funk-influenced piece with John Paul Jones on clavinet, it was included on their 1975 album Physical Graffiti. The song was released as a single in several countries and was frequently performed in concert.

Lyrics
The lyrics were inspired by blues musician Robert Johnson's 1936 song "Terraplane Blues". A Terraplane is a classic car, and the song uses car parts as metaphors for sex—"pump your gas", "rev all night", etc. The themes of these songs however differ; "Terraplane Blues" is about infidelity, while "Trampled Under Foot" is about giving in to sexual temptation.

Composition and recording
The song evolved out of a jam session in 1972 and is credited to Robert Plant, Jimmy Page and John Paul Jones. Much rehearsal went into perfecting the relentless semi-funk riff that dominates this song. John Paul Jones has credited Stevie Wonder with the inspiration for the beat ("Superstition", 1972), which he played on a clavinet. Page played through a wah-wah pedal and, as producer, employed reverse echo on the recording.

Reception and charts
Billboard described "Trampled Under Foot" as "the most commercial single [Led Zeppelin] put together in several years" and as having "a powerful staccatto beat." Cash Box called it a "high-powered effort" that "packs a punch that is sure to be felt on top of the charts." Record World said that "As Zeppelin-sanity begins to reach Beatlemaniacal proportions, the stage is set for the heavy metalmen to take their first single from Physical Graffiti to the top." Released in April 1975, it reached number 38 on the Billboard Hot 100.

Live performances and other versions

"Trampled Under Foot" became a standard part of Led Zeppelin concerts from 1975 onwards, being played on every tour until 1980.
In 2012, the song was performed during the London Olympics opening ceremony as a part of a selected playlist.

A rough mix of the track with less overdubbing was titled "'Brandy & Coke' ". It was released on 11 February 2015 (on iTunes), as part of the remastering process of all nine albums. The rest of the album was released on 23 February 2015.

See also
List of cover versions of Led Zeppelin songs
List of Led Zeppelin songs written or inspired by others

References

1975 singles
1975 songs
Funk rock songs
Led Zeppelin songs
Song recordings produced by Jimmy Page
Songs written by Jimmy Page
Songs written by John Paul Jones (musician)
Songs written by Robert Plant
Swan Song Records singles